Dunchideock is a small civil parish on the north eastern slopes of the Haldon Hills in Teignbridge, Devon, England. The parish, with a population of 262 in 2001, lacks a compact village, but consists of scattered dwellings. It is surrounded clockwise from the north by the parishes of Holcombe Burnell, Ide, Shillingford St. George, Kenn, and Doddiscombsleigh.

The name Dunchideock is of Celtic origin. Recorded in the Domesday Book of 1086 as Donsedoc, the two parts of the name derive from dun (fort) and coediog (wooded), which, according to W. G. Hoskins, refer to the nearby Iron Age hill fort of Cotley Castle.

The parish church is dedicated to St Michael and is Grade I listed. It originated in 1308 at the latest, but the present church building, built of red sandstone, was started in the late 14th century. It has been partially rebuilt and restored many times. There is a good font dated to around 1400, some notable carved bench-ends, roof-bosses and rood-screen; and several memorials, most notably to Aaron Baker, who rebuilt the chancel aisle in 1669, and Stringer Lawrence. The theological writer Bourchier Wrey Savile was rector of Dunchideock with Shillingford St. George from 1872 to his death in 1888.

Within the parish was the former Haldon House which was the home of Sir Robert Palk, 1st Baronet. Mostly demolished in the 1920s, the remaining wing is now the Best Western "Lord Haldon Hotel". Also in the parish is Haldon Belvedere, a triangular tower on top of Haldon that was built by Palk in 1788 in memory of his friend General Stringer Lawrence.

Archie Winckworth, the former owner of Dunchideock House, posted a memoir about the village and its history, including an account of its buried treasure. The cellars of Dunchideock House are fancifully supposed to contain a treacle mine.

References

it is owned by the ellis family which they have owned for 5 generations

External links

Civil parishes in Devon